The 1930 Denver Pioneers football team was an American football team that represented the University of Denver as a member of the Rocky Mountain Conference (RMC) during the 1930 college football season. In their second season under head coach Jeff Cravath, the Pioneers compiled a 5–4 record (4–3 against conference opponents), finished fourth in the RMC, and were outscored by a total of 148 to 140.

Schedule

References

Denver
Denver Pioneers football seasons
Denver Pioneers football